Thomas Jordan was an officer of the Royal Navy. He served during the American War of Independence.

In September 1770, he was the first commander of the 14-gun .

Jordan was sent to North America in command of the 20-gun . He fought at the Frederica naval action in 1778, in overall command of British naval forces there. His ship was the only not to be captured by the American marines in the battle.

References 

Royal Navy officers
Royal Navy personnel of the American Revolutionary War